The Battle of Point Pedro 2007 was a naval battle that occurred on June 19, 2007 near Point Pedro, Jaffna, Sri Lanka. The battle took place when Sri Lankan Navy patrol boats were attacked by a group of Tamil Tiger patrol boats off the shore of Point Pedro.

Prelude

The sea Tigers were the naval branch of the Liberation Tamil Tigers of Eelam (LTTE), who fought against the Sri Lankan Navy for independence until 2009. The parties had multiple open water skirmishes over the duration of the war, the most notable clashes taking place in water corridor between Point Pedro (Jaffna) and Trincomalee city, as the Tigers were in control of the city at one point in the war and frequented the route to conduct attacks on Naval targets such as the bombing of SLNS Sooraya and SLNS Ranasuru.

A previous battle at Point Pedro in 2006 took place when patrol boats escorting a 700 man naval troop transport came under attack by Tiger patrol boats and a suicide craft, aimed at sinking the transport vessel. The attack was eventually repelled through Lieutenant Commander Edirisinghe ramming the suicide craft with his patrol boat causing the explosion and the remaining LTTE boats to retreat.

Attack
The battle began when the Sri Lankan Navy attempted to recover a patrol boat that had drifted out into Tiger controlled waters. Fighting erupted when 24 Tiger patrol boats ambushed the government forces as they reached the drifting boat. The Navy repelled the attack through the use of Mil Mi-24 helicopter gunships and the patrol boats dispatched initially. The Sri Lankan government estimated rebel losses at 40 men  killed and nine patrol boats destroyed.

Aftermath in 2008
The following year in November 2008, chief petty officer K. G. Shantha was killed in action, after he rammed his arrow-class patrol boat against a suicide craft that had aimed to detonate when in proximity of a group of naval vessels off the shore of Point Pedro.  The attack was successfully thwarted and Shantha was awarded the highest Sri Lankan military award, the Parama Weera Vibhushanaya. This information however, was contested as the LTTE claimed to have successfully sunk two naval vessels.

References

Point Pedro
Point Pedro
Point Pedro
2007 in Sri Lanka
June 2007 events in Asia
Point Pedro